Khaled Elleithy is an Egyptian professor of Computer Science and Engineering. He is the current Dean of the College of Engineering, Business, and Education and he is also serving as Associate Vice President for Graduate Studies and Research at the University of Bridgeport.

Education 
He obtained his first degree in computer science and automatic control in 1983 from Alexandria University . He bagged his Master's degree  in computer networks from the same institution in 1986.  He obtained another Master's degree in Computer Science in 1988 and Ph.D. degree 1990 from the Center for Advanced Computer Studies, University of Louisiana , Lafayette.

Scientific contributions 
He discovered new applications for wireless technology and he built epilepsy detection device that could detect the signal before the attack.

Fellowship and membership
He is a senior Member of the IEEE computer society. In 1990 he became a member of the Association for Computing Machinery (ACM) and a member of Special Interest Group on Computer Architecture. In 1983 he became a lifetime member of the Egyptian Engineering Syndicate. In 1988 he became a member of IEEE Circuits & Systems society and IEEE Computer Society. In 2018 he was elected as a member of African Academy of Sciences

References 

Egyptian scientists
Egyptian academics
Egyptian academic administrators
Alexandria University alumni
University of Louisiana at Lafayette alumni
Deans (academic)
Year of birth missing (living people)
Living people